Philip I (c. 1130 – 13 August 1191) was the Archbishop of Cologne and Archchancellor of Italy from 1167 to 1191.

He was the son of Count Goswin II of Heinsberg and Adelaide of Sommerschenburg. He received his ecclesiastic training in Cologne and Rheims, becoming dean of the cathedral chapter in Cologne and then provost of Liège. In late Summer 1167, he was raised to the archchancery and the archdiocese of Cologne, where he was consecrated 29 September 1168. In that year, he entered into and mediated the controversy between France and England.

As bishop, Philip continued the policies of his predecessors. He exceeded all of them, however, in his territorial expansions, buying up the lands of his vassals and selling many for a profit. Philip held his fief directly from the emperor and was the greatest of the imperial tenants-in-chief. By buying up his vassals' subvassals, he tied them closer to himself. Frederick Barbarossa, however, saw a threat in the archbishop's pretensions and allied himself to the competing baronial factions of the region, especially Henry IV of Luxembourg, who had a hereditary claim to the Hainaut. Barbarossa also made Aachen and Duisburg royal cities with trade privileges in order to weaken Cologne economically.

Despite this, Philip remained a supporter of Frederick. As archchancellor, he campaigned with him in Italy on several occasions. He was present at the disastrous Battle of Legnano on 29 May 1176, where Barbarossa's Italian ambitions were left slain on the field. On 13 April 1180, Philip was created Duke of Westphalia in the breakup of the old Duchy of Saxony following the dispossession of Henry the Lion. With Westphalia in his control, Philip was the most powerful lord of the north of the realm and threatened the power and influence of the emperor. At the Diet of Pentecost in Mainz in 1184, he raised Baldwin V of Hainault to margravial status. Philip responded by negotiating with Pope Urban III, then at odds with Barbarossa, and Canute IV of Denmark. He also moved to support the old count of Luxembourg, who had claims to Hainault. Philip further lent his support to the anti-Imperial candidate to the Archbishopric of Trier, Folmar of Karden, and erected a fortress in Zeltingen to that purpose, The archbishop's wider attempts to align the German episcopate against the emperor failed, however.

Around Whitsuntide 1187, Philip defeated an imperial army on its way to oppose Philip II of France. At this, the emperor formally accused the archbishop of unfaithfulness. In March 1188, Philip was subjected to the emperor at a council in Mainz. He made peace the next year (1189). In 1190, Philip was again playing a political rôle, this time mediating between Barbarossa and Henry the Lion. Philip accompanied the new Emperor Henry VI into Italy, to seize the Kingdom of Sicily in right of his wife Constance, in 1191 and died at the siege of Naples during an epidemic – either bubonic plague or malaria. His body was returned to Cologne.

In 1180 he began construction on Cologne's city wall. Documents dated 27 July and 18 August of the year attest to the beginning of work on what would become Europe's largest city wall until 1881. He also began the Shrine of the Three Kings, in which was found (1864) one of his coins.

References

Rosamond McKitterick, David Abulafia. The New Cambridge Medieval History: pts. 1–2. c. 1024-c. 1198 Cambridge University Press, 2004 pg. 403

1130s births
1191 deaths

Year of birth uncertain
Archbishops of Cologne
Medieval chancellors (government)
Dukes of Westphalia
12th-century Roman Catholic archbishops in the Holy Roman Empire
Burials at Cologne Cathedral
Cathedral deans of Cologne